Thermophis baileyi, also known commonly as Bailey's snake, the hot-spring keelback, the hot-spring snake, and the Xizang hot-spring keelback, is a rare species of colubrid snake endemic to Tibet.

Etymology
The specific name, baileyi, is in honor of Frederick M. Bailey, a British army officer and explorer.

Geographic range
T. baileyi is found only at high altitudes on the Tibetan Plateau.
In 1990 Macey and Papenfuss reported the species from Yangbajain hot spring area. So far T. baileyi is known only from a few sites. A comprehensive distribution map of T. baileyi was provided by Hofmann et al. (2014), showing that the geographic range of the snake is a restricted area between the Transhimalaya and the Himalaya, along the central part of the Yarlung Zhangbo suture zone.

Description
Thermophis baileyi is olive green, with five series of indistinct spots dorsally, most pronounced in the forebody. It has a dusky postocular streak, and dusky posterior edges to the labials. The belly is bluish-grey, with each ventral black basally. The young are darker than adults.

The dorsal scales are in 19 rows at midbody, all keeled except the last row, with indistinct double apical facets. The ventrals number 201–221. The anal is divided. The subcaudals number 91-111, mostly divided, but with a few entire.

Conservation status
Bailey's snake is considered Near Threatened by IUCN. In the last decades, the growing exploitation of geothermal energy has led to a destruction of hot spring habitats, resulting in an increased threat to populations of hot-spring snakes.

Taxonomy
The existence of Bailey's snake was first announced in the scientific literature in 1907, when it was described as a new species by Frank Wall. Wall originally classified it as Tropodinotus baileyi. In 1953 Malnate referred to it as Tropidonotus (= Natrix) baileyi, and realizing that Bailey's snake did not fit in the genus Natrix, placed it in the new genus Thermophis, designating T. baileyi as the type species.

Habitat
Snakes of the genus Thermophis live probably at the highest altitude of any snakes in the world.
The presence of T. baileyi is strongly attributable to hot springs with low sulphur concentration, locations in river valleys that provide rocky slopes and vegetated shorelines, and existence of a river within a  radius.

References

External links
 Hot spring snakes at Life is Short but Snakes are Long

Colubrids
Snakes of China
Endemic fauna of Tibet
Reptiles described in 1907
Taxa named by Frank Wall